Seagull Books is a publishing venture begun in Kolkata in 1982 by Naveen Kishore, a theater practitioner. It began primarily as a response to the growing need for an Indian publishing house for theater and the other arts and since then it has expanded its operations to include translations of world literature as well as twentieth- and twenty-first-century critical theory and non-fiction. At present, the company has registered divisions in London and New York City alongside its initial establishment in Kolkata (Calcutta).

Origin
Beginning with the series New Indian Playwrights which translated the work of regional Indian playwrights into English, the project grew to accommodate film scripts, especially post-production film scripts.
The function of English in India as a link language made it possible for plays composed in the regional languages to be brought onto the same platform and thereby widening the scope of national theater. The series attempted to enhance important play scripts with additional material to provide the interested student, scholar, theater person and reader with more complete access to the script. Theater, the cinema, theoretical writings on the cinema and art made up the initial catalogue of Seagull Books and since its inception, its focus has always laid in the direction of what might be termed as "the human condition".

Today, Seagull Books is widely considered one of the world's most respected publisher of literature in English translation. It publishes more than 50 books a year, almost 80 per cent of which are translations from various languages, including French, German, Italian, Spanish, Arabic, Chinese, Bengali, Norwegian, Dutch, Turkish and Hungarian, among others. Seagull's titles are celebrated for their exquisite covers, designed by senior editor and graphic designer Sunandini Banerjee, and extraordinary production values. Seagull's authors include some of the most revered names in 20th- and 21st-century world literature, from Nobel Laureates Jean-Paul Sartre, Imre Kertesz, Elfriede Jelinek, Herta Müller and Mo Yan to Jorge Luis Borges, Antonin Artaud, Roland Barthes, René Char, Max Frisch, Frienrich Dürrenmatt, Thomas Bernhard, Christa Wolf, Ingeborg Bachmann, Urs Widmer, Jean Baudrillard, Guy Debord, Alexander Kluge, Hans Magnus Enzensberger, Yves Bonnefoy, Philippe Jaccottet, Cees Nooteboom, Ngugi wa Thiong'o, Maryse Condé, Mahasweta Devi, Pascal Quignard, Hélène Cixous, Giorgio Agamben, Antjie Krog, William Kentridge, Tomas Espedal, Wolfgang Hilbig, Sibylle Lewitscharoff, Ghassan Zaqtan, Alawiya Sobh, and Man Booker International Prize winner László Krasznahorkai. Contemporary English-language authors published by Seagull include Zakes Mda, Toby Litt, Tariq Ali, Dan Gunn and philosopher Gayatri Chakravorty Spivak. Seagull is committed to publishing young contemporary authors; emerging European authors brought to the international arena by Seagull's translations include Dorothee Elmiger, Jan Brandt, Gunther Geltinger, Thomas Lehr, Florence Noiville, Lola Lafon, Abdourahman A. Waberi, Monica Cantieni, Melinda Nadj Abonji, Tilman Rammstedt and Abbas Khider, among others.

Seagull has been publishing specifically dedicated series of translations under the French List, German List, Swiss List, Norwegian List, Italian List, Hungarian List and, most recently, Arab List and India List; it boasts a backlist of nearly 400 titles, many of which have been widely and very positively reviewed in the international press. Seagull is currently developing two eclectic and important series—Elsewhere Texts (edited by Gayatri Chakravorty Spivak and Hosam Aboul-Ela, a list that focuses on non-European leftist scholarship) and Pride List (which publishes queer writing from around the world).

Distribution
One of the ways Seagull circumvented the problem of being limited to the status of a small independent publishing house catering to a niche market was by securing international distribution that would source its books to a global audience. At present, the University of Chicago Press holds the distribution rights for Seagull Books throughout the world, except India, where it is distributed by Atlantic Publishers and Distributors. This is not co-publication venture; Seagull generally holds world rights for its books.

Other projects

Seagull Arts and Media Resource Centre
In 1987, Naveen Kishore founded the Seagull Foundation for the Arts which was to function as a not for profit charitable trust. Under that trust, various activities are carried out, one of which has been the Seagull Arts and Media Resource Centre. The Resource Centre possesses a vast Arts library where for a nominal sum, one can become a member. Along with the Arts library, there are film and music libraries. Various activities related to performance in the arts are organized and carried out by the Resource Centre; ranging from dance recitals, play readings, photography exhibitions, book reviews to theater workshops. His background in showcasing in the arts helped Naveen Kishore channel his energy into the Resource Centre. The selling and showcasing of art acts  as fundraisers for the revenue earned on the books is not always enough since most of the books published by Seagull are slow sellers and selling the art helps the company to raise money for its non profit enterprises as well as some of the profit activities.

Seagull Foundation for the Arts
The Foundation creates and presents arts exhibitions, major retrospectives by senior artists, focuses on non-saleable aspects or areas of an artist's work that commercial galleries are reluctant to exhibit and conducts research and documents the life and work of respected artists such as the late Nirode Mazumdar.It carries out video-biography projects using the mainstream medium of television to share the lives and professional histories of important artists and translates contemporary plays by playwrights in Bengali, Hindi, Marathi, Gujarati, Malayalam, Kannada and Meitei.It has also initiated a Theater for Change project with funding from the UK-based Network for Social Change and collaborates with two Calcutta NGOs that work with women victims of violence and with children from disadvantaged backgrounds.

PeaceWorks
PeaceWorks—An initiative of The Seagull Foundation initially began as a direct response to the Godhra riots of 2002, during which time it was felt that the religious polarization between the Hindu and the Muslim communities needed to be addressed and examined. PeaceWorks thus began with discussing the Hindu-Muslim divide with young children, making them watch films, encouraging them to participate in theater and talk about this difference. Instead of restricting PeaceWorks to just the religious issue, it now talks about living with difference. This could be any kind of difference: physical, sexual or related to gender. It tackles and exposes children to the idea of difference through the arts. 
Though PeaceWorks is a not for profit charitable trust under the Seagull Foundation for the Arts and has no immediate or direct link with Seagull Books, being an independent organization in itself, there is a great deal of crossover between the two establishments. Being a relatively small organization, staff members from Seagull Books often collaborate on PeaceWorks' projects and help in organizing its events.

The Seagull School of Publishing
The Seagull Foundation for the Arts, in association with Seagull Books and supported by the Royal Norwegian Embassy, New Delhi, established the Seagull School of Publishing in 2012. The institute is located in Calcutta, West Bengal. It offers two professional courses—in Editing and Book Design. The institute is managed entirely by practicing publishers, editors and designers who are passionate about the craft of publishing. Course duration is three months, and held twice every year (January–March and June–August).

Seagull School of Publishing offers a platform for prospective editors and book designers to hone their skills. Hands-on training is coupled with interactive sessions with professionals from publishing houses in India and abroad. The courses include field trips to printing presses, research trips to bookstores, open-house discussions on current issues, and projects. Classes focus on a range of subjects from buying and selling of rights in the national–international markets to the phenomenon of e-books and digital publishing. The school is equipped with a state-of-the-art design lab and a well-stocked library to help prepare each student for the global world of publishing.

Publications
At present, each book published is classified under one of the several series heads.
Seagull World Literature
Swiss List
German List
Italian List
French List
India List
Arab List 
Elsewhere Texts
Enactments
In Performance
Manifestos for the 21st Century
Conversation Series
What Was Communism?
Selected Works of Mahasweta Devi
Selected Works of Utpal Dutt
Selected Works of Badal Sircar
Culture Studies
New Indian Playwrights
Performance Theory
Seagull Filmscripts
Film Theory
Art

References

External links 

1982 establishments in West Bengal
Book publishing companies of India
Companies based in Kolkata
Publishing companies established in 1982